Operation Unthinkable was the name given to two related possible future war plans developed by the British Chiefs of Staff Committee against the USSR during 1945. The plans were never implemented. The creation of the plans was ordered by British Prime Minister Winston Churchill in May 1945 and developed by the British Armed Forces' Joint Planning Staff in May 1945 at the end of World War II in Europe.

One plan assumed a surprise attack on the Soviet forces stationed in Germany to impose "the will of the United States and British Empire"  on the Soviets. "The will" was qualified as "a square deal for Poland", which probably meant enforcing the recently-signed Yalta Agreement. The planners decided that without American help, the British would probably fail. The assessment, signed by the Chief of Army Staff on 9 June 1945, concluded: "It would be beyond our power to win a quick but limited success and we would be committed to a protracted war against heavy odds". The code name was now reused instead for a second plan, which was a defensive scenario by which the British were to defend against a Soviet drive towards the North Sea and the Atlantic Ocean after the withdrawal of the American forces from the Continent. When the Labour Party acquired power by the 1945 general election, it ignored the draft plan.

The study became the first Cold War-era contingency plan for war against the USSR. Both plans were very secret and were not made public until 1998 although a British spy for the Soviets, Guy Burgess, had revealed some details to the Soviets at the time.

Operations

Offensive
The initial primary goal of the operation was declared as "to impose upon Russia the will of the United States and the British Empire. Even though 'the will' of these two countries may be defined as no more than a square deal for Poland, that does not necessarily limit the military commitment". (The Soviet Union is referred to as "Russia" throughout the document, a metonym that was common in the West throughout the Cold War.)

The chiefs of staff were concerned that both the enormous size of the Soviet forces deployed in Europe at the end of the war and the perception that Soviet Premier Joseph Stalin was unreliable caused a Soviet threat to exist in Western Europe. The USSR had yet to launch its attack on Japanese forces and so one of the assumptions in the report was that the Soviets would instead ally with Japan if the Western Allies commenced hostilities.

The hypothetical date for the start of the Allied invasion of Soviet-held Europe was scheduled for 1 July 1945, four days before the United Kingdom general elections. The plan assumed a surprise attack by as many as 47 British and American divisions in the area of Dresden, in the middle of Soviet lines. That represented almost half of the approximately 100 divisions available to the British, American and Canadian headquarters at that time.

The plan was considered by the British Chiefs of Staff Committee as militarily unfeasible due to an anticipated 2.5:1 superiority in divisions of Soviet land forces in Europe and the Middle East by 1 July, when the conflict was projected to occur. Most of the offensive operation would have been performed by American and British forces, as well as Polish forces and as many as 10 divisions of the German army, remobilised from prisoner-of-war status. Any quick success would be caused by surprise alone. If a quick success could not be obtained before the beginning of winter, the assessment was that the Allies would be committed to a protracted total war. In the report of 22 May 1945, an offensive operation was deemed "hazardous".

The following table is based on Allied estimates at the time of the planning of Operation Unthinkable.

Defensive
In response to an instruction by Churchill of 10 June 1945, a follow-up report was written on "what measures would be required to ensure the security of the British Isles in the event of war with Russia in the near future". American forces were relocating to the Pacific region for a planned invasion of Japan, and Churchill was concerned that the reduction of forces would give the Soviets a strong advantage for offensive action in Western Europe. The report concluded that if the United States engaged solely in the Pacific Theatre, Britain's odds "would become fanciful".

The Joint Planning Staff rejected Churchill's notion of retaining bridgeheads on the Continent as not having any operational advantage. It was envisaged that Britain would use its air force and navy to resist, but a threat from mass rocket attack was anticipated, with no means of resistance except for strategic bombing.

Subsequent discussions
By 1946, tensions and conflicts were developing between the Allied-occupied and the Soviet-occupied areas of Europe and were considered as resulting potentially in conflict. One such area was the Julian March (an area of Southeastern Europe that is now divided among Croatia, Slovenia and Italy), and on 30 August 1946, informal discussions occurred between the British and the American chiefs of staff concerning how such a conflict could develop and the best strategy for conducting a European war. Again, the issue of retaining a bridgehead on the continent was discussed, with Dwight D. Eisenhower preferring a withdrawal to the Low Countries, rather than to Italy, because of their proximity to the United Kingdom.

Possible Soviet awareness
During June 1945, the senior Soviet Army commander Marshal Georgy Zhukov suddenly ordered Soviet forces in Poland to regroup and prepare their positions for defence. According to University of Edinburgh Professor John Erickson, Operation Unthinkable helps to explain why Zhukov did so. If the plans of the operation had been transmitted to Moscow by the Cambridge Five, that would explain the sudden orders to regroup and prepare for defence; however, it is just as possible that the decision was caused by Soviet mistrust of the Western Allies. If the Soviets had indeed known that the Western Allies were planning a possible attack, the element of surprise would have been lost before operations against the Soviets even began and further reduce the chances of Operation Unthinkable succeeding.

See also

 Operation Dropshot
 Operation Pike
 Operation Downfall
 Plan Totality
 Seven Days to the River Rhine
 Soviet offensive plans controversy

References
Informational notes

Citations

Bibliography

  
 Hines, Sam. Operation Unthinkable. Its significance in the development of the Cold War (GRIN Verlag, 2016).
  
 Norton-Taylor, Richard (2 October 1998) "Churchill plotted invasion of Russia" The Guardian
  
 Ruane, Kevin (2016) Churchill and the Bomb in War and Cold War London: Bloomsbury Academic

External links
 Julian Lewis: Changing Direction: British Military Planning for Post-war Strategic Defence, 2nd edn., Routledge, 2008, pp.xxx-xl
Operation Unthinkable: Churchill's plan to start World War III
 

Cancelled military operations involving the United Kingdom
Cancelled military operations involving the United States
Cold War military history of the United Kingdom
Soviet Union–United Kingdom relations
Cancelled invasions
Military plans